Chang Ping (born 22 June 1968), whose real name is Zhang Ping,  is a Chinese writer and Curator of June 4th Museum of Memory and Human Rights. He won the Human Rights Press Awards in Hong Kong in 2014 and the CJFE 2016 International Press Freedom Award in Canada.

Chang Ping has a reputation for writing about politically sensitive topics, including democracy, media censorship, the failures of government policy and Tibet. His commentaries have appeared in Southern Weekend, Southern Metropolis Weekly in China, South China Morning Post, Apple Daily in Hong Kong, Deutsche Welle, Süddeutsche Zeitung in Germany and New York Times in USA.

Chang Ping has repeatedly been punished for tackling sensitive issues and was banned from writing columns and publishing books in China. He was removed as news director of Southern Weekend, then a daring weekly that had won readers across the country in 2001. He became deputy editor of Southern Metropolis Weekly, but was removed in 2008, due to a commentary that carried the headline "Tibet: Nationalist Sentiment and the Truth” enraged Chinese nationalists who supported a crackdown on what the government called separatist activities in Tibet. In 2010, he was finally fired by the newspaper, with an editor saying his work was“inappropriate.” But he said to New York Times, “I will keep writing, I won’t stop.”

Chang Ping joined Hong Kong-based magazine, iSun Affairs, in 2011, as chief editor but was denied a visa and has not been allowed into the former British colony. Late in 2011, Chang Ping was invited to live in Germany at the former country home of the Nobel Prize winner Heinrich Böll, which has been converted into a refuge for persecuted writers.

In March 2016, Chang Ping's two younger brothers and a younger sister were allegedly "abducted by the Chinese police" after he wrote an article for Deutsche Welle related to a "public letter", which was posted online demanding that Communist Party general secretary Xi Jinping's resign.

Chang Ping was a guest professor at East China University of Political Science and Law in Shanghai, and a senior research fellow at the Southern Metropolis Communication Institute in Guangzhou. In a lecture at Fudan University in Shanghai he said, "We should transform into a civil society rather than wait for a virtuous leader."

On 15 November 2014, Chang Ping lectured at the 33rd anniversary of the PEN International's Day of the Imprisoned Writer to highlight the fate of Tibetan writers imprisoned by Chinese authorities in Dharamsala, India, "Where’s our home? It lies in the words that we speak. How many words have been spoken? That shall determine our emotional connection to home."

Chang Ping has been a longtime observer of the feminist movement and Chinese politics. He wrote a series of articles expressing his worry that "Chinese Dream" spelled a setback for women's rights.

References

External links

 
 

People's Republic of China journalists
Writers from Nanchong
Living people
1968 births
People's Republic of China musicians
Chinese dissidents
Poets from Sichuan
20th-century Chinese male writers
21st-century Chinese male writers